Iker Flores Galarza (born 28 July 1976 in Galdakao, Basque Country) is a Spanish former professional road bicycle racer, who rode professionally between 1999 and 2007 for the  and  teams. He took the overall victory at the Tour de l'Avenir, along with one stage, in 2000. However, Flores did not add any professional victories, and finished the 2005 Tour de France as Lanterne Rouge, as did his brother Igor Flores in 2002. Flores was known for his attacking style of riding.

Major results

2000
 1st Overall Tour de l'Avenir
1st Stage 9
2001
 1st Mountains classification Circuit de la Sarthe
2007
 1st  Sprints classification Tour of the Basque Country

References

External links 
Team Profile (in Spanish)
Eurosport Profile

Palmarès

1976 births
Living people
Sportspeople from Biscay
Spanish male cyclists
People from Galdakao
Cyclists from the Basque Country (autonomous community)